Jalek Shiquan Felton (born May 1, 1998) is an American professional basketball player for Fiobanka Jindřichův Hradec of the Czech National Basketball League. He played college basketball for the North Carolina Tar Heels.

High school career
Coming into college basketball, Jalek Felton was the 28th best player in class. He signed with North Carolina over Kansas and South Carolina.

College career
Felton played one season for North Carolina, where he averaged 2.9 points per game in 22 games. He was suspended by the university on January 30, 2018, in response to misconduct allegations for reasons that remained largely unknown at the time. In March of that year, Felton withdrew from the university; documents released in August 2020 under a court order in response to a public records lawsuit by The Daily Tar Heel show that he was found to have committed "Sexual Assault or Sexual Violence" by the university and was expelled from the entire UNC System, given a no-contact order, and banned from the campus for four years. Felton considered transferring to a different school after leaving UNC, but ultimately opted to turn professional.

Professional career
Felton started playing professional basketball for Petrol Olimpija in 2018. In the beginning of 2019 he signed a deal with BC Nokia.

In February 2020, Felton has signed a contract to play for Venados, of the Mexican Circuito de Baloncesto de la Costa del Pacífico. In two games he posted 8.0 points, 2.5 rebounds and 4.5 assists per game. On September 21, Felton signed with Czech club Fiobanka Jindřichův Hradec.

Personal life
His uncle Raymond Felton is also a professional basketball player who played in the NBA for over 15 years after playing at North Carolina as well.

References

External links
 ESPN profile
 USA Basketball bio

1998 births
Living people
American expatriate basketball people in Finland
American expatriate basketball people in Slovenia
American expatriate basketball people in Mexico
American men's basketball players
Basketball players from South Carolina
BC Nokia players
KK Olimpija players
North Carolina Tar Heels men's basketball players
People from Mullins, South Carolina
Point guards